Nupserha aterrima is a species of beetle in the family Cerambycidae. It was described by Stephan von Breuning in 1967.

References

aterrima
Beetles described in 1967